Ivanna Madruga (born 27 January 1961) is a retired tennis player from Argentina who played professionally in the 1980s. She also is known under the married name Ivanna Madruga-Osses.

Career
In 1980, with compatriot Adriana Villagrán, she reached the women's doubles final at the Roland Garros, losing to Kathy Jordan and Anne Smith. She reached three quarterfinals in Grand Slam tournaments, once at the French Open and twice at the US Open.

Madruga represented her country in Federation Cup from 1978 to 1984.

Grand Slam finals

Women's doubles (1 runner–up)

WTA Tour finals

Singles (2 runner-ups)

Doubles 3 (1 title, 2 runner-ups)

References

External links 
 
 
 

1961 births
Argentine female tennis players
Living people
Sportspeople from Córdoba Province, Argentina